Tulika Ganguly (born 25 August 1989) is an Indian singer who works in Bollywood films, as well as reality shows.

Career
She was doing her graduation in political Science from Gargi College of Delhi University, New Delhi, when she decided to participate in Indian Idol Season 4. Tulika is a classically trained singer who is now doing live shows and concerts worldwide. Tulika was the former face of the Bollywood channel UTV Stars, for which she anchored several shows.

References

1987 births
Living people
Indian women playback singers
Indian Idol participants
Indian women pop singers
21st-century Indian singers
Bollywood playback singers
21st-century Indian women singers
People from Faridabad
Singers from Haryana
Women musicians from Haryana